Perlon is an electronic music record label founded in 1997 in Frankfurt, Germany, now based in Berlin, and run by Thomas Franzmann aka Zip and Markus Nikolai. It is a minimal techno and tech house label which has been characterised as one of the most influential German dance music labels. Its catalogue features music by producers such as A Guy Called Gerald, Akufen, Ricardo Villalobos, Baby Ford, Dandy Jack, Luciano, Matt John, Pantytec, Stefan Goldmann and Thomas Melchior. It is mostly a vinyl label, apart from a compilations and DJ mixes released on CD. No releases have been made available online in digital formats.

Perlon has run a monthly party named 'Get Perlonized' at Berghain's Panorama Bar in Berlin since 2005 featuring only DJs who have also released on the label. The record label is known for its distinctive graphic design by Chris Rehberger of the graphic design studio Double Standards.

References

External links
 Official Perlon website
Discogs: Perlon
Resident Advisor: Perlon

German record labels
Electronic music record labels